Ganjigatti is a village in Dharwad district of Karnataka, India.

Demographics 
As of the 2011 Census of India there were 848 households in Ganjigatti and a total population of 4,406 consisting of 2,198 males and 2,208 females. There were 570 children ages 0-6.

References

Villages in Dharwad district